Paul Bakker is a professor in medieval and renaissance philosophy at Radboud University.

Academic research 
Bakkers' research is mainly focused on medieval commentaries on Aristotle's Physics and De Anima and the complex relations between philosophical and theological arguments presented therein. He has also published within the discipline of the philosophy of mind on topics such as 'the relation between body, soul, and mind, theories of the soul's faculties, and views of sense perception'.

Campus ban 
In 2020, Radboud University revealed that an investigation into social safety would be initiated, of which Bakker would be the subject. The investigation concluded that he was guilty of having committed 'inappropriate behaviour'. As a result of this conclusion, his promotion to dean was cancelled and he received a campus ban lasting one semester.

References

Living people
Writers from The Hague
Radboud University Nijmegen alumni
Academic staff of Radboud University Nijmegen
Year of birth missing (living people)